Even Better than the Real Thing Vol. 3 is an Irish charity two-disc album featuring a variety of artists performing acoustic covers. Despite the title of the series being taken from a U2 song, the previous albums did not contain any U2 covers. This third, two-disc volume departs from this and is entirely composed of U2 songs, many of them by artists who recorded covers for volume one or volume two.

It was released in 2005 by RMG Chart Entertainment Ltd., and like the other albums, most of the songs were recorded "live and acoustic" on The Ray D'Arcy Show on Today FM. Proceeds from the album were donated to the UNICEF Tsunami relief fund.

Track listing

See also
Even Better Than the Real Thing Vol. 1
Even Better Than the Real Thing Vol. 2

References

2005 compilation albums
Compilation albums by Irish artists
Charity albums
The Ray D'Arcy Show
U2 tribute albums